KTPA (1370 AM, "KTPA 1370 AM Classic Country") was a radio station broadcasting a classic country music format. Licensed to Prescott, Arkansas, United States, the station was last owned by Newport Broadcasting Company.

KTPA began broadcasting on December 1, 1959, as a 500-watt, daytime-only station.

KTPA was deleted on February 4, 2022.

References

External links
FCC Station Search Details: DKTPA (Facility ID: 48745)
FCC History Cards for KTPA (covering 1957-1980)

TPA (AM)
Defunct radio stations in the United States
Radio stations established in 1959
Radio stations disestablished in 2022
1959 establishments in Arkansas
2022 disestablishments in Arkansas
TPA (AM)
TPA (AM)
Prescott, Arkansas